The Kohl International Teaching Awards honored elementary and high school teachers as well as media and lifetime contributors to the field of education. The Dolores Kohl Education Foundation gave the awards between 1985 and 1994. The awards went to Chicago-area teachers, as well as national and international teachers. Recipients of the awards, along with recipients of the Kohl McCormick Early Childhood Teaching Awards, are members of the Kohl McCormick Academy of Outstanding Educators.

External links
Kohl International Teaching Awards
Dolores Kohl Education Foundation
Kohl McCormick Early Childhood Teaching Awards

Teacher awards